Guy Bernardin was a French sailor born in 1945 in Saint-Briac-sur-Mer, Ille-et-Vilaine, and disappeared at sea in August 2017, is a French skipper. He has participated in several offshore races, including two BOC Challenges, the 1989–1990 Vendée Globe and the 1990 Route du Rhum. On 2 October 2017 his 15-metre sailboat Crazy Horse, which he had just acquired, was found empty off Cape Codin the United States. He had left Southporton the East Coast of the United States on 9 August for La Turballe and had not given any sign of life since 15 August.

Key results
 1980: 44th of the English Transat, on the 38 feet Rasto
 1981: Twostar, on the 38-foot Rasto
 1983: 4th in the BOC Challenge (Class 2), on the 38-foot Rasto
 1984: 2nd in the English Transat (class 2 monohull), on the 44-foot Biscuits LU
 1985: 2nd of the Twostar, on the IMOCA 60 Biscuits LU 2
 1987: 4th in the BOC Challenge, on the IMOCA 60 Biscuits LU 2
 1990: Abandoned in the 1989–1990 Vendée Globe, on the 60 feet O-KAY
 1990: 16th of the Route du Rhum, on the 60 feet Rancagua

References

1945 births
2017 deaths
Sportspeople from Ille-et-Vilaine
French male sailors (sport)
IMOCA 60 class sailors
French Vendee Globe sailors
1989 Vendee Globe sailors
Single-handed circumnavigating sailors